Franck-Yves Bambock (born 7 April 1995) is a French footballer who plays for Grenoble as a defensive midfielder.

Club career
Born in Douala, Bambock moved to France at early age, and joined Paris Saint-Germain's youth setup in 2008 at the age of 13, after starting it out at Antony Sport. He made his senior debuts with the reserves in 2013, in Championnat de France amateur.

On 16 July 2015 Bambock moved abroad for the first time in his career, signing a two-year deal with Spanish Segunda División side SD Huesca. He made his professional debut on 22 August, coming on as a second-half substitute for Iñigo Ros in a 2–3 home loss against Deportivo Alavés.

On 12 July 2017, Bambock signed a one-year deal with Eredivisie side Sparta Rotterdam. After appearing rarely and mainly for the B-side, he cut ties with the club the following February.

On 1 February 2018, Bambock returned to Spain and its second level after signing for Córdoba CF, but registration problems meant he could not feature for the side during the remainder of the season. He was finally included in the B-team in Segunda División B in April, being only registered to the first-team on 16 August.

On 18 January 2019, Bambock terminated his contract with the Blanquiverdes, and joined Israeli side Maccabi Petah Tikva FC four days later.

On 21 June 2019, Bambock signed a contract with Marítimo.

On 12 August 2021, he joined Grenoble on a two-year contract.

References

External links
 
 
 
 
 

1995 births
Living people
Footballers from Douala
French footballers
France youth international footballers
Cameroonian footballers
French sportspeople of Cameroonian descent
Association football midfielders
Paris Saint-Germain F.C. players
Segunda División players
Segunda División B players
SD Huesca footballers
Córdoba CF B players
Córdoba CF players
Sparta Rotterdam players
Maccabi Petah Tikva F.C. players
C.S. Marítimo players
Grenoble Foot 38 players
Eredivisie players
Israeli Premier League players
Primeira Liga players
Ligue 2 players
French expatriate footballers
French expatriate sportspeople in Spain
French expatriate sportspeople in the Netherlands
French expatriate sportspeople in Israel
Expatriate footballers in Spain
Expatriate footballers in the Netherlands
Expatriate footballers in Israel
Expatriate footballers in Portugal